Nils Jensen (25 December 1935 – 16 January 2010) was a Danish footballer. He played in one match for the Denmark national football team in 1961.

References

External links
 

1935 births
2010 deaths
Danish men's footballers
Denmark international footballers
Place of birth missing
Association footballers not categorized by position